He Xingxiang (born November 1963) is a former Chinese banker who served as vice governor of China Development Bank from 2014 to 2021. As of September 2021 he was under investigation by China's top anti-corruption agency.

Biography
He was born in Shaoxing, Zhejiang, in 1963. He once served as governor of the Bank of China, Shangyu Branch and then the Bank of China, Jiaxing Branch in east China's Zhejiang province. In September 2004 he was promoted to become governor of the Bank of China, Hainan Branch, a position he held until April 2008, when he was transferred to north China's Shandong province as governor of the Bank of China, Shandong Branch..
In October 2014 he was promoted again to become vice governor of the Agricultural Development Bank of China, and served until April 2020, while he was despatched to China Development Bank as vice governor.

Downfall
On 10 September 2021, he has been placed under investigation for "serious violations of laws and regulations" by the Central Commission for Discipline Inspection (CCDI), the party's internal disciplinary body, and the National Supervisory Commission, the highest anti-corruption agency of China. Hu Huaibang, former chairman of the China Development Bank, was placed under investigation for alleged "serious violations of discipline and law" in July 2019.

References

1963 births
Living people
People from Shaoxing
Chinese bankers